The Barton ministry (Protectionist) was the 1st ministry of the Government of Australia. It was led by the country's 1st prime minister, Sir Edmund Barton. The Barton ministry was formed on 1 January 1901 when Federation took place. The ministry was replaced by the First Deakin ministry on 24 September 1903 following Barton's retirement from Parliament to enter the inaugural High Court.

James Drake, who died in 1941, was the last surviving member of the Barton ministry; Drake was also the last surviving minister of the First Deakin ministry and the Reid government. Elliot Lewis was the last surviving member of the inaugural Barton ministry.

Ministry

References

Ministries of Queen Victoria
Ministries of Edward VII
Australian Commonwealth ministries
1900s in Australia
1901 establishments in Australia
1903 disestablishments in Australia
Cabinets established in 1901
Cabinets disestablished in 1903